Brendan Owens is an American engineer who has served since January 2023 as assistant secretary of defense for energy, installations, and environment in the Biden administration. Owens was confirmed to the post on January 23, 2023, by a Senate vote of 60–35, and sworn in on January 26, 2023.

Education 
Owens earned a Bachelor of Science degree in civil engineering from Purdue University.

Career 
From 1997 to 2002, Owens worked as an engineer for SpecPro Inc., an engineering firm based in San Antonio. From 2002 to 2019, he was the vice president of the U.S. Green Building Council for LEED technical development. Since 2019, he has worked as the chief of innovation for ecountabl, a technology company. He is also a principal at Black Vest Strategy, a consulting firm.

References 

Living people
American civil engineers
Engineers from Virginia
Purdue University alumni
Biden administration personnel
United States Department of Defense officials
People from Alexandria, Virginia
Year of birth missing (living people)